The Italian Swimming Federation (FIN), founded in 1899 is the principal Swimming Federation in Italy. It brings together more than 1200 clubs.

See also
 Italy national swimming team
 Italy at the World Aquatics Championships
 Swimming Summer Olympics medal table

External links
 

Italy
Swimming organizations
Italy
Swimming
1899 establishments in Italy